County Hospital Louth is a healthcare facility in High Holme Road, Louth, Lincolnshire, England. It is managed by United Lincolnshire Hospitals NHS Trust.

History
The facility, which was designed by Sir George Gilbert Scott and William Bonython Moffatt, opened as Louth Union Workhouse in 1837. An infirmary was built at the rear of the site. It became the Louth County Infirmary in 1930 and, after joining the National Health Service in 1948, it became County Hospital Louth in 1955. A major programme of fire protection works was carried out at the hospital in autumn 2017.

References

External links
Official site

Hospital buildings completed in 1837
Hospitals in Lincolnshire
Hospitals established in 1837
1837 establishments in England
NHS hospitals in England